In mathematics, the Banach game is a topological game introduced by Stefan Banach in 1935 in the second addendum to problem 43 of the Scottish book as a variation of the Banach–Mazur game.

One observation about the game is that if  is a countable set, then either of the players can cause the final sum to avoid the set. Thus in this situation the second player can win.

References

Further reading 
 

Topological games